Clinidium oberthueri is a species of ground beetle in the subfamily Rhysodinae. It was described by Antoine Henri Grouvelle in 1903. It is known from Ecuador where it is known with certainty from the eastern side of the Andes, and from Barbacoas, Nariño, on the other versant of the Andes in Colombia.

Clinidium oberthueri measures  in length.

References

Clinidium
Beetles of South America
Arthropods of Colombia
Invertebrates of Ecuador
Beetles described in 1903